This list of the longest arch bridge spans ranks the world's arch bridges by the length of their main span. The length of the main span is the most common way to rank bridges as it usually correlates with the engineering complexity involved in designing and constructing the bridge. If one bridge has a longer span than another it does not necessarily mean that the bridge is longer from shore to shore or from abutment to abutment.

Completed bridges

Under construction

History of largest spans
Flags refer to present national boundaries.

See also

 
 
 List of longest masonry arch bridge spans
 List of spans (list of remarkable permanent wire spans)

References
 Structurae.com, International Database for Civil and Structural Engineering 

 HighestBridges.com, Sakowski, Eric (Wiki)

 Others references

Further reading
 
 

Arch
Arch bridges, List of by length
Arch bridges, List of by length
Lists of construction records
Bridges, arch